Peter Lerche (January 12, 1928 – March 14, 2016) was a German jurist. Between 1964 and 1996 he held a chair for constitutional law at the Ludwig Maximilian University of Munich. His research interests also included media law.

Born in Leitmeritz, Sudetenland, Lerche studied law at the Ludwig Maximilian University of Munich, earning his Habilitation in 1958 (thesis: , "Exorbitance and constitutional law") under supervision of Theodor Maunz. He accepted a chair at the Free University of Berlin in 1961, before joining the faculty at LMU in 1964.

References

External links

1928 births
2016 deaths
German jurists
Ludwig Maximilian University of Munich alumni
Academic staff of the Ludwig Maximilian University of Munich
People from Litoměřice
Naturalized citizens of Germany
Sudeten German people